This is a list of notable people who were born or have lived in Voronezh, Russia.

Born in Voronezh

18th century 
Yevgeny Bolkhovitinov (1767–1837), Orthodox Metropolitan of Kiev and Galicia
 Mikhail Pavlov (1792–1840), Russian academic and professor at Moscow University

19th century

1801–1850 
 Aleksey Koltsov (1809–1842), Russian poet
 Ivan Nikitin (1824–1861), Russian poet
 Nikolai Ge (1831–1894), Russian realist painter famous for his works on historical and religious motifs
 Vasily Sleptsov (1836–1878), Russian writer and social reformer
 Nikolay Kashkin (1839–1920), Russian music critic

1851–1900 
 Valentin Zhukovski (1858–1918), Russian orientalist
 Vasily Goncharov (1861–1915), Russian film director and screenwriter, one of the pioneers of the film industry in the Russian Empire
 Anastasiya Verbitskaya (1861–1928), Russian novelist, playwright, screenplay writer, publisher and feminist
 Mikhail Olminsky (1863–1933), Russian Communist
 Serge Voronoff (1866–1951), French surgeon of Russian extraction
 Andrei Shingarev (1869–1918), Russian doctor, publicist and politician
 Ivan Bunin (1870–1953), the first Russian writer to win the Nobel Prize for Literature
 Alexander Ostuzhev (1874–1953), Russian and Soviet drama actor
 Valerian Albanov (1881–1919), Russian navigator and polar explorer
 Jan Hambourg (1882–1947), Russian violinist, a member of a famous musical family
 Volin (1882–1945), anarchist
 Boris Hambourg (1885–1954), Russian cellist who made his career in the USA, Canada, England and Europe
 Boris Eikhenbaum (1886–1959), Russian and Soviet literary scholar, and historian of Russian literature
 Anatoly Durov (1887–1928), Russian animal trainer
 Samuil Marshak (1887–1964), Russian and Soviet writer, translator and children's poet
 Eduard Shpolsky (1892–1975), Russian and Soviet physicist and educator
 George of Syracuse (1893–1981), Eastern Orthodox archbishop of the Ecumenical Patriarchate
 Yevgeny Gabrilovich (1899–1993), Soviet screenwriter
 Semyon Krivoshein (1899–1978), Soviet tank commander; Lieutenant General
 Andrei Platonov (1899–1951), Soviet Russian writer, playwright and poet
 Ivan Pravov (1899–1971), Russian and Soviet film director and screenwriter
 William Dameshek (1900–1969), American hematologist

20th century

1901–1930 
 Ivan Nikolaev (1901–1979), Soviet architect and educator
 Galina Shubina (1902–1980), Russian poster and graphics artist
 Pavel Cherenkov (1904–1990), Soviet physicist who shared the Nobel Prize in physics in 1958 with Ilya Frank and Igor Tamm for the discovery of Cherenkov radiation, made in 1934
 Yakov Kreizer (1905–1969), Soviet field commander, General of the army and Hero of the Soviet Union
 Iosif Rudakovsky (1914–1947), Soviet chess master
 Pawel Kassatkin (1915–1987), Russian writer
 Alexander Shelepin (1918–1994), Soviet state security officer and party statesman
 Grigory Baklanov (1923–2009), Russian writer
 Gleb Strizhenov (1923–1985), Soviet actor
 Vladimir Zagorovsky (1925–1994), Russian chess grandmaster of correspondence chess and the fourth ICCF World Champion between 1962 and 1965
 Konstantin Feoktistov (1926–2009), cosmonaut and engineer
 Vitaly Vorotnikov (1926–2012), Soviet statesman
 Arkady Davidowitz (1930), writer and aphorist

1931–1950 
 Grigory Sanakoev (1935), Russian International Correspondence Chess Grandmaster, most famous for being the twelfth ICCF World Champion (1984–1991)
 Yuri Zhuravlyov (1935), Russian mathematician
 Mykola Koltsov (1936–2011), Soviet footballer and Ukrainian football children and youth trainer
 Vyacheslav Ovchinnikov (1936), Russian composer
 Iya Savvina (1936–2011), Soviet film actress
 Tamara Zamotaylova (1939), Soviet gymnast, who won four Olympic medals at the 1960 and 1964 Summer Olympics
 Yury Smolyakov (1941), Soviet Olympic fencer
 Yevgeny Lapinsky (1942–1999), Soviet Olympic volleyball player
 Galina Bukharina (1945), Soviet athlete
 Vladimir Patkin (1945), Soviet Olympic volleyball player
 Vladimir Proskurin (1945), Soviet Russian football player and coach
 Aleksandr Maleyev (1947), Soviet artistic gymnast
 Valeri Nenenko (1950), Russian professional football coach and player

1951–1970 
 Vladimir Rokhlin, Jr. (1952), Russian-American mathematician and professor of computer science and mathematics at the Yale University
 Lyubov Burda (1953), Russian artistic gymnast
 Mikhail Khryukin (1955), Russian swimmer
 Aleksandr Tkachyov (1957), Russian gymnast and two times Olympic Champion
 Nikolai Vasilyev (1957), Russian professional football coach and player
 Aleksandr Babanov (1958), Russian professional football coach and player
 Sergey Koliukh (1960), Russian political figure; 4th Mayor of Voronezh
 Yelena Davydova (1961), Soviet gymnast
 Aleksandr Borodyuk (1962), Russian football manager and former international player for USSR and Russia
 Aleksandr Chayev (1962), Russian swimmer
 Elena Fanailova (1962), Russian poet
 Alexander Litvinenko (1962–2006), officer of the Russian FSB and political dissident
 Yuri Shishkin (1963), Russian professional football coach and player
 Yuri Klinskikh (1964–2000), Russian musician, singer, songwriter, arranger, founder rock band Sektor Gaza
 Yelena Ruzina (1964), athlete
 Igor Bragin (1965), footballer 
 Gennadi Remezov (1965), Russian professional footballer
 Valeri Shmarov (1965), Russian football player and coach
 Konstantin Chernyshov (1967), Russian chess grandmaster
 Igor Pyvin (1967), Russian professional football coach and player
 Vladimir Bobrezhov (1968), Soviet sprint canoer

1971–1980 
 Oleg Gorobiy (1971), Russian sprint canoer
 Anatoli Kanishchev (1971), Russian professional association footballer
 Ruslan Mashchenko (1971), Russian hurdler
 Aleksandr Ovsyannikov (1974), Russian professional footballer
 Dmitri Sautin (1974), Russian diver who has won more medals than any other Olympic diver
 Sergey Verlin (1974), Russian sprint canoer
 Maxim Narozhnyy (1975–2011), Paralympian athlete
 Aleksandr Cherkes (1976), Russian football coach and player
 Andrei Durov (1977), Russian professional footballer
 Nikolai Kryukov (1978), Russian artistic gymnast
 Kirill Gerstein (1979), Jewish American and Russian pianist
 Evgeny Ignatov (1979), Russian sprint canoeist
 Aleksey Nikolaev (1979), Russian-Uzbekistan footballer
 Aleksandr Palchikov (1979), former Russian professional football player
 Konstantin Skrylnikov (1979), Russian professional footballer
 Aleksandr Varlamov (1979), Russian diver
 Angelina Yushkova (1979), Russian gymnast
 Maksim Potapov (1980), professional ice hockey player

1981–1990 
 Alexander Krysanov (1981), Russian professional ice hockey forward
 Yulia Nachalova (1981–2019), Soviet and Russian singer, actress and television presenter
 Andrei Ryabykh (1982), Russian football player
 Maxim Shchyogolev (1982), Russian theatre and film actor
 Eduard Vorganov (1982), Russian professional road bicycle racer
 Anton Buslov (1983–2014), Russian astrophysicist, blogger, columnist at The New Times magazine and expert on transportation systems
 Dmitri Grachyov (1983), Russian footballer
 Aleksandr Kokorev (1984), Russian professional football player
 Dmitry Kozonchuk (1984), Russian professional road bicycle racer for Team Katusha
 Alexander Khatuntsev (1985), Russian professional road bicycle racer
 Egor Vyaltsev (1985), Russian professional basketball player
 Samvel Aslanyan (1986), Russian handball player
 Maksim Chistyakov (1986), Russian football player
 Yevgeniy Dorokhin (1986), Russian sprint canoer
 Daniil Gridnev (1986), Russian professional footballer
 Vladimir Moskalyov (1986), Russian football referee
 Elena Danilova (1987), Russian football forward
 Sektor Gaza (1987–2000), punk band
 Regina Moroz (1987), Russian female volleyball player
 Roman Shishkin (1987), Russian footballer
 Viktor Stroyev (1987), Russian footballer
 Elena Terekhova (1987), Russian international footballer
 Natalia Goncharova (1988), Russian diver
 Yelena Yudina (1988), Russian skeleton racer
 Dmitry Abakumov (1989), Russian professional association football player
 Igor Boev (1989), Russian professional racing cyclist
 Ivan Dobronravov (1989), Russian actor
 Anna Bogomazova (1990), Russian kickboxer, martial artist, professional wrestler and valet
 Yuriy Kunakov (1990), Russian diver
 Vitaly Melnikov (1990), Russian backstroke swimmer
 Kristina Pravdina (1990), Russian female artistic gymnast
 Vladislav Ryzhkov (1990), Russian footballer

1991–2000 
 Danila Poperechny (1994), Russian stand-up comedian, actor, youtuber, podcaster
 Darya Stukalova (1994), Russian Paralympic swimmer
 Viktoria Komova (1995), Russian Olympic gymnast
 Vitali Lystsov (1995), Russian professional footballer
 Marina Nekrasova (1995), Russian-born Azerbaijani artistic gymnast
 Vladislav Parshikov (1996), Russian football player
 Dmitri Skopintsev (1997), Russian footballer
 Alexander Eickholtz (1998) American sportsman
 Angelina Melnikova (2000), Russian Olympic gymnast

Lived in Voronezh 
 Aleksey Khovansky (1814–1899), editor
 Ivan Kramskoi (1837–1887), Russian painter and art critic
 Mitrofan Pyatnitsky (1864–1927), Russian musician
 Mikhail Tsvet (1872–1919), Russian botanist
 Alexander Kuprin (1880–1960), Russian painter, a member of the Jack of Diamonds group
 Osip Mandelstam (1891–1938), Russian poet
 Gavriil Troyepolsky (1905–1995), Soviet writer
 Nikolay Basov (1922–2001), Soviet physicist and educator
 Vasily Peskov (1930–2013), Russian writer, journalist, photographer, traveller and ecologist
 Valentina Popova (1972), Russian weightlifter
 Igor Samsonov, painter
 Tatyana Zrazhevskaya, Russian boxer

See also 

 List of Russians
 List of Russian-language poets
 List of famous Russians

Voronezh
Voronezh
List